Thryonomyidae is a family of hystricognath rodents that contains the cane rats (Thryomys) found throughout sub-Saharan Africa, and a number of fossil genera.

Taxonomy
Thryonomyidae was formerly more diverse and widespread, with fossil relatives found in India and Arabia as well.
The extinct genus Sacaresia from the island of Mallorca off Spain may also be a member of this family, though its position remains uncertain.

Genus †Epiphiomys 
†Epiphiomys coryndoni
Genus †Gaudeamus
†Gaudeamus aegyptius
Genus †Kochalia
†Kochalia geespei
Genus †Monamys
†Monamys simonsi
Genus †Neosciuromys
†Neosciuromys africanus
Genus †Paraphiomys 
†Paraphiomys afarensis
†Paraphiomys hopwoodi
†Paraphiomys knolli
†Paraphiomys occidentalis
†Paraphiomys orangeus
†Paraphiomys pigotti
†Paraphiomys renelavocati 
†Paraphiomys shipmani
Genus †Paraulacodus
†Paraulacodus indicus 
†Paraulacodus johanesi 
Genus †Protohummus
†Protohummus dango 
Genus †Sacaresia?
†Sacaresia moyaeponsi
Genus Thryonomys
Thryonomys gregorianus
Thryonomys swinderianus 
†Thryonomys asakomae

Former fossil members of the family include the genus Apodecter and two species of Paraphiomys (australis and roessneri), which have now been transferred to the related Petromuridae.

References

Rodent families
Taxa named by R. I. Pocock
Hystricognath rodents